Reddy is a surname of Irish origin, derived from the Gaelic Ó Rodaigh, a patronymic name meaning descendant of Rodach.

Notable people 
 Bianca Reddy, Australian netball player
 Helen Reddy (1941–2020), Australian-American singer and activist of Irish ancestry
 Joel Reddy (born 1985), Australian rugby league footballer
 Liam Reddy (born 1981), Australian footballer
 Michael Reddy (born 1980), Irish footballer
 Michael Reddy, Irish politician
 Michelle Reddy, women's rights worker in Fiji
 Patsy Reddy, Governor General of New Zealand
 Rod Reddy (born 1954), Australian rugby league footballer and coach

See also
Reddy (disambiguation)
Ready (surname)

Footnotes

English-language surnames
Anglicised Irish-language surnames